In mathematics, the Young–Deruyts development is a method of writing invariants of an action of a group on an n-dimensional vector space V
in terms of invariants depending on at most n–1 vectors .

References

Invariant theory